Turn Left at Thursday is a collection of science fiction short stories by American writer Frederik Pohl, published by Ballantine Books in 1961.

Contents
 "Mars by Moonlight" (Galaxy Science Fiction, June 1958)
 "The Richest Man in Levittown" (also known as "The Bitterest Pill]"; Galaxy Science Fiction, April 1959)
 "The Seven Deadly Virtues" (as by Paul Flehr] - Galaxy Science Fiction August '58
 "The Martian in the Attic" - If July '60
 "Third Offense" (as by Charles Satterfield; Galaxy Science Fiction, August 1958)
 "The Hated" (as by Paul Flehr; Galaxy Science Fiction, January 1958)
 "I Plinglot, Who You?" (Galaxy Science Fiction]], February 1959)

1961 short story collections
Short story collections by Frederik Pohl
Ballantine Books books